Hostages is a 2017 drama film directed and written by Rezo Gigineishvili and co-written by Lasha Bugadze. It was screened in the Panorama section at the 67th Berlin International Film Festival. The film is based on true story and tells about group of Georgian youngster who try to escape the Soviet Union by hijacking a plane in 1983.

Plot
During the early 80's in the Soviet Georgia, just a few years before the collapse of the Soviet Union, a group of young people from respected Georgian families were looking to escape the Soviet Union. The Beatles's music, jeans, American cigarettes, position in society, guaranteed future. They seemed to have everything except one thing —   freedom. Unfortunately, The price of their freedom was their own demise. A true story based on the events of 1983, when six guys and one girl tried to hijack a plane in order to escape from the USSR.

Cast
Merab Ninidze (Levan)
Darejan Kharshiladze (Nino)
Tinatin Dalakishvili (Anna)
Avtandil Makharadze (Shota, Sandro's father)
Irakli Kvirikadze (Nika)
Giga Datiashvili (Koka)
Giorgi Grdzelidze (Sandro)
George Tabidze (Oto)
Giorgi Khurtsilava (Lasha)
Vakhtang Chachanidze (Irakli)
Ekaterine Kalatozishvili (Tamuna)

Production
The film is a Georgian-Russian co-production and the producing companies are: NEBO film   Russia; 20 Steps Productions -Georgia). The film's script has won a co-production competition which was held by the Georgian National Film Center.

London-based sales agent WestEnd Films has acquired world rights to Rezo Gigineishvili's drama film, after its premiere in the Panorama strand of the 2017 Berlin Film Festival.

References

External links
 

2017 films
2017 drama films
2010s Russian-language films
Russian multilingual films
2010s Georgian-language films
Drama films from Georgia (country)
Multilingual films from Georgia (country)
2017 multilingual films